It's Gonna Be Alright may refer to:

"It's Gonna Be Alright" (Deep Zone song), 1995
"It's Gonna Be Alright" (Ruby Turner song), 1989

See also
It's Gonna Be Right, 1985 album by Cheryl Lynn
It's Gonna Be OK (disambiguation)